The 1919–20 Bradford City A.F.C. season was the 13th in the club's history.

This was the first season after World War I, football having been suspended during the war.

The club finished 15th in Division One, and reached the 4th round of the FA Cup. The exit in the 4th round to Bristol City was a "shock" and was blamed on the players visiting a chocolate factory before the match.

Sources

References

Bradford City A.F.C. seasons
Bradford City